Prigorodnoye is a rural locality (a selo) and the administrative center of Prigorodny Selsoviet of Belogorsky District, Amur Oblast, Russia. The population was 427 as of 2018. There are 9 streets.

Geography 
Prigorodnoye is located 15 km south of Belogorsk (the district's administrative centre) by road. Belotserkovka is the nearest rural locality.

References 

Rural localities in Belogorsky District